Hamdan Qarmat ibn al-Ash'ath (CE) was the eponymous founder of the Qarmatian sect of Isma'ilism. Originally the chief Isma'ili missionary in lower Iraq, in 899 he quarreled with the movement's leadership at Salamiya after it was taken over by Sa'id ibn al-Husayn (the future first Fatimid Caliph), and with his followers broke off from them. Hamdan then disappeared, but his followers continued in existence in the Syrian Desert and al-Bahrayn for several decades.

Life
Hamdan's early life is unknown, except that he came from the village of al-Dur in the district of Furat Badaqla, east of Kufa. He was originally an ox-driver, employed in carrying goods. He enters the historical record with his conversion to the Isma'ili doctrine by the missionary al-Husayn al-Ahwazi. According to the medieval sources about his life, this took place in or around AH 261 (874/75 CE) or AH 264 (877/78 CE).

His surname "Qarmat" is considered as being probably of Aramaic origin. However, the Twelver Shi'a scholar al-Fadl ibn Shadhan, who died in 873/74, is known to have written a refutation of "Qarmatian" doctrines. This means that either Hamdan had become active several years before the date recorded in the sources, or alternatively that he took his surname from the sect, rather than the other way round.

Missionary activity

The  al-Husayn al-Ahwazi had been sent by the Ismai'li leadership at Salamiya, and when he died (or left the area), Hamdan assumed the leadership of Isma'ili missionary activity in the rural environs of Kufa and southern Iraq. He soon moved his residence to the town of Kalwadha, south of Baghdad, and rapidly won many new converts among the peasantry and the Bedouin. His success was aided by the turmoil of the time. The Abbasid Caliphate was enfeebled, and Iraq was in chaos due to the Zanj Revolt. At the same time, the mainstream Twelver Shi'a adherent were becoming increasingly dissatisfied due to the political quietism of their leadership, as well as by the vacuum left by the death of the eleventh imam Hasan al-Askari and the supposed "occultation" of the twelfth imam, Muhammad al-Mahdi, in 874.

His most prominent disciple and aide was his brother-in-law Abu Muhammad Abdan, who "enjoyed a high degree of independence" (Daftary) and appointed his own s in Iraq, Bahrayn and southern Persia. Among the men trained and sent to missions as s by Hamdan and Abu Muhammad were Abu Sa'id al-Jannabi (Persia and Bahrayn), Ibn Hawshab and Ali ibn al-Fadl al-Jayshani (to the Yemen), as well as Abu Abdallah al-Shi'i, who later helped convert the Kutama in Ifriqiya and opened the way to the establishment of the Fatimid Caliphate. According to the 11th-century Sunni heresiologist Abu Mansur al-Baghdadi, al-Ma'mun, a  active in southern Persia, was a brother of Hamdan.

Although Hamdan corresponded with the Salamiya group, their identity remained a secret, and Hamdan was able to pursue his own policy locally. Thus in 880 his numbers were large enough to make overtures for an alliance with the leader of the Zanj, Ali ibn Muhammad, who rebuffed the offer. In 890/91, a fortified refuge was established by Hamdan for his supporters near Kufa.

Only in 891/92 did reports from Kufa denouncing this "new religion" and reporting on mounting Qarmatian activity begin to cause concern in Baghdad. However, no action was taken against them at the time. As this group was the first to come to the attention of the Abbasid authorities, the label of "Qarmatians" soon came to be applied by Sunni sources to Ismai'li populations in general, including those were not proselytized by Hamdan.

Doctrine
No direct information on the doctrine preached by Hamdan and Abu Muhammad is known, but modern scholars like Farhad Daftary consider it to have been, in all likelihood, the same as that propagated at the time from Salamiya, and described in the writings of al-Nawbakhti and Ibn Babawayh. Until then, this knowledge was restricted, and only those initiated in the doctrine could access part of it. As a result of these beliefs, the Qarmatians often abandoned traditional Islamic law and ritual. Contemporary mainstream Islamic sources claim that this led to lascivious behaviour among them, but this is not trustworthy given their hostile stance towards Qarmatians.

Split with Salamiya and possible reconciliation

In 899, following the death of the previous leader of the sect at Salamiya, Sa'id ibn al-Husayn, the future founder of the Fatimid Caliphate, became the leader. Soon, he began making alterations to the doctrine, which worried Hamdan. Abu Muhammad went to Salamiya to investigate the matter, and learned that Sa'id claimed that the expected  was not Muhammad ibn Isma'il, but Sa'id himself. This caused a major rift in the movement, as Hamdan denounced the leadership in Salamiya, gathered the Iraqi s and ordered them to cease the missionary effort. Shortly after this Hamdan "disappeared" from his headquarters at Kalwadha. According to Wilferd Madelung, given Ibn Hawqal's Fatimid sympathies and friendship with Abu Ali's son, "his information may well be reliable".

Abu Ali Hasan claimed descent from Muslim ibn Aqil ibn Abi Talib and settled at Fustat, the capital of Egypt. From there he attempted to regain the support of Hamdan's followers, but those in Iraq and Bahrayn refused; Ibn Hawshab in Yemen and Abu Abdallah al-Shi'i in Ifriqiya, however, accepted his authority, and used him as an intermediary with Sa'id in Salamiya. When Sa'id fled from Syria and spent a year in Fustat in 904/905, Abu Ali was responsible for their safety. Following the establishment of the Fatimid Caliphate in 909, Abu Ali visited Sa'id, now caliph, in Ifriqiya, and was sent to spread Islam in Byzantine Asia Minor, where he was captured and imprisoned for five years. After his release he returned to Ifriqiya, where Sa'id's son and heir apparent, the future caliph al-Qa'im bi-Amr Allah, appointed him as chief , with the title "Gate of Gates". He died in 933, and his son Abu'l-Hasan Muhammad succeeded him as chief .

Subsequent history of the Qarmatian movement
After Hamdan's disappearance, the term "Qarmatians" was retained by all Isma'ilis who refused to recognize the claims of Sa'id, and subsequently of the Fatimid dynasty. At times it was also applied by non-Isma'ilis in a pejorative sense to the supporters of the Fatimids as well. Abu Muhammad was murdered in the same year at the instigation of Zakarawayh ibn Mihrawayh, apparently on the instructions of Salamiya. Hamdan's and Abu Muhammad's followers threatened to kill Zakarawayh, who himself was forced to hide. The s appointed by Abu Muhammad then resumed their work, denouncing the claims of Sa'id in Salamiya, and continuing the Qarmatian movement, although Abu Muhammad was often cited as the source of their religious and philosophical works. A Qarmatian movement (the so-called Baqliyya) survived in lower Iraq for several decades thereafter, with their teachings ascribed largely to Abu Muhammad.

In the Syrian Desert and lower Iraq, Zakarawayh soon assumed the initiative, at first covertly. Through his sons, Zakarawayh sponsored a great uprising in Syria 902–903, that was brought to an end in the Battle of Hama in November 903; although probably designed to bring about a pro-Fatimid revolution, the large-scale Abbasid reaction it precipitated and the attention it brought on him forced Sa'id to abandon Salamiya for the Maghreb, where he would found the Fatimid state in Ifriqiya. The Qarmatians had more success in Bahrayn, where Abu Sa'id al-Jannabi, who had been sent to the region  by Hamdan and Abu Muhammad, founded an independent Qarmatian state that became a major threat to the Abbasids in the 10th century. Other Qarmatian groups existed independently in Yemen, Rayy, and Khurasan.

Footnotes

References

Sources 

 
 
 
 
 
 
 

9th-century Arabs
9th century in the Abbasid Caliphate
People from Kufa
Qarmatians
Ismaili da'is
Year of birth unknown
Year of death unknown
9th-century births
9th-century Ismailis